Ravindra Kumar Sinha may refer to :

 Ravindra Kumar Sinha (biologist), an Indian biologist, Vice Chancellor for Nalanda Open University
 Ravindra Kumar Sinha (physicist), an Indian physicist, Professor in Applied Physics at Delhi Technological University